The 2005 Asian Tour was the 11th season of the modern Asian Tour, the main men's professional golf tour in Asia excluding Japan, since it was established in 1995. Thaworn Wiratchant won the Order of Merit, becoming the first player to pass $500,000 earnings in a season.

Schedule
The following table lists official events during the 2005 season.

Order of Merit
The Order of Merit was titled as the UBS Order of Merit and was based on prize money won during the season, calculated in U.S. dollars.

Awards

Notes

References

External links
The Asian Tour's official English language site

Asian Tour
Asian Tour